Shurab-e Saghir (also Romanized as Shūrāb-e Şaghīr and Shoorab Saghir; also known as Shūr Āb) is a village in Saman Rural District of the Central District of Saman County, Chaharmahal and Bakhtiari province, Iran. At the 2006 census, its population was 2,743 in 694 households. The following census in 2011 counted 2,985 people in 837 households. The latest census in 2016 showed a population of 3,294 people in 1,015 households; it was the largest village in its rural district. The village is populated by Turkic people.

References 

Saman County

Populated places in Chaharmahal and Bakhtiari Province

Populated places in Saman County